Lincheng Town is a town and the county seat in the south central Huitong County, Hunan, China. Its seat of local government is at Fengxiangling Community.

See also
List of township-level divisions of Hunan

References

External links

Divisions of Huitong County
County seats in Hunan
Towns of Hunan